The Sindi  ( were an ancient Scythian people who primarily lived in western Ciscaucasia. A portion of the Sindi also lived in Central Europe. Their name is variously written, and Pomponius Mela calls them Sindones, Lucian, Sindianoi.

History

Ciscaucasia

The Sindi were a tribe of the Scythians who established themselves on the Taman peninsula, where they formed a ruling class over the indigenous North Caucasian Maeotians. Archaeologically, the Sindi belonged to the Scythian culture, and they progressively became Hellenised due to contact with the Bosporan Kingdom.

As the Scythians lost more territory in Ciscaucasia to the Sauromatians over the course of the late 6th century BC, the Sindi remained the only Scythian group still present in the region, in the area called Sindica by the Greeks and which corresponded to the area west of present-day Krasnodar, in the Taman peninsula.

The kingdom of Sindica existed for only a brief time, and it was soon annexed by the Bosporan Kingdom.

Central Europe
Unlike the majority of the Sindi, who remained in the northern Caucasus, a smaller section of the Sindi migrated westwards and settled into the Hungarian Plain as part of the expansion of the Scythian into Central Europe during the 7th to 6th centuries BC, and they soon lost contact with the Scythians who remained in the Pontic Steppe. The 3rd century BC Greek author Apollonius of Rhodes located a population of the Sindi living alongside the Sigynnae and the otherwise unknown Grauci in the "plain of Laurion", which is likely the eastern part of the Pannonian Basin.

Archaeology

North Caucasus
The Scythian ruling class in the Maeotian country initially buried their dead in kurgans while the native Maeotian populace were buried in flat cemeteries. Burials in Sindica continued this tradition, and members of the Sindi ruling class continued being buried in kurgans while the Maeotians continued to be buried in flat graves.

After earlier Scythian earthworks built in the 6th century BC along the right bank of the Kuban river were abandoned in the 4th century BC, when the Sauromatians took over most of Ciscaucasia, the Sindi built a new series of earthworks on their eastern borders.

References

Citations

Sources

 
 
 
Trubachov, Oleg N., 1999: Indoarica, Nauka, Moscow.

Ancient peoples of Russia
History of the western steppe
Historical Iranian peoples
Scythian tribes